American School of Tangier (AST) is an American international school in Tangier, Morocco, serving preschool through grade 12. In Morocco it is considered a non-profit organization, and AST is incorporated in the U.S. state of Delaware as a 501(c)(3) nonprofit. The American School of Tangier is accredited by the Middle States Association of Colleges and Schools.

Omar Pound founded the school in 1950, when the city was a part of the Tangier International Zone. Joseph McPhillips III served as the headmaster of AST for 35 years.

Operations
The school uses English as the medium of instruction in most courses, while Arabic and French courses have their respective languages as their mediums of instruction.

Persons residing in the U.S. and persons residing in Morocco are members of the school's board of trustees.

Campus
Athletic facilities include an outdoor pool, a soccer field, and a gymnasium.

The Nancy Eastman Library serves as the school library.

The school offers dormitory facilities for people visiting the school.

Student body
As of 2016 the school has 378 students, served by 64 faculty members.

References

External links
 American School of Tangier

Schools in Tangier
American international schools in Morocco
1950 establishments in Morocco
Educational institutions established in 1950
20th-century architecture in Morocco